Lotto Petrus (born 3 December 1987) is a Namibian professional racing cyclist. In 2011 and 2012 he won the Namibian National Road Race Championships.

Major results

2005
 3rd 
2009
 African Road Championships
1st  Under-23 road race
2nd  Team time trial
8th Road race
2011
 National Road Championships
1st  Road race
1st  Time trial
 7th Time trial, African Road Championships
2012
 National Road Championships
1st  Road race
1st  Time trial
2013
 3rd Road race, National Road Championships
2014
 2nd 
2016
 3rd 
 National Road Championships
4th Road race
5th Time trial
2018
 3rd 
 4th Road race, National Road Championships

References

External links
 
 

1987 births
Living people
Namibian male cyclists
Place of birth missing (living people)